Tulosesus mitrinodulisporus is a species of mushroom-forming fungus in the family Psathyrellaceae.

Taxonomy 
It was first described by Italian mycologists Francesco Doveri and Sabrina Sarrocco as new to science in 2011, it was found growing on the dung of chamois (Rupicapra rupicapra).

The species was known as Coprinellus mitrinodulisporus until 2020 when the German mycologists Dieter Wächter & Andreas Melzer reclassified many species in the Psathyrellaceae family based on phylogenetic analysis.

Etymology 
The specific epithet mitrinodulisporus, which combines the Latin words mitra ("mitre"), nodulus ("small knob"), and spora ("spore"), refers to the shape of the spores. The fungus is known only from the type locality in Aosta, Italy.

References

External links

mitrinodulisporus
Fungi described in 2011
Fungi of Europe
Tulosesus